The 2023 Nigerian presidential election in Plateau State will be held on 25 February 2023 as part of the nationwide 2023 Nigerian presidential election to elect the president and vice president of Nigeria. Other federal elections, including elections to the House of Representatives and the Senate, will also be held on the same date while state elections will be held two weeks afterward on 11 March.

Background
Plateau State is a diverse, agriculture-based state in the North Central; although it has vast natural resources, Plateau has faced issues in security as inter-ethnic violence and conflict between herders and farmers heavily affect the state. The overproliferation of weaponry and increased pressure for land along with failures in governance led to the worsening of these clashes in the years ahead of the election.

The 2019 Plateau elections were mixed for both major parties. On the federal level, PDP nominee Atiku Abubakar won the state by 8% but it swung slightly towards Buhari; legislatively, the parties fairly evenly split the Senate seats and House of Representatives seats. Statewise, incumbent APC Governor Simon Lalong won re-election by about 4% of the vote and the APC won a majority in the House of Assembly.

Polling

Projections

General election

Results

By senatorial district 
The results of the election by senatorial district.

By federal constituency
The results of the election by federal constituency.

By local government area 
The results of the election by local government area.

See also 
 2023 Plateau State elections
 2023 Nigerian presidential election

Notes

References 

Plateau State gubernatorial election
2023 Plateau State elections
Plateau